The A476 is a main road in Wales, linking Llanelli with the A483, the Swansea to Manchester Trunk road near the market town of Llandeilo.

Settlements served by the road include:
Llanelli
Panteg
Llannon
Upper Tumble
Cross Hands
Gorslas
Carmel
Golden Grove
Ffairfach ( south of Llandeilo)

Roads in Wales
Transport in Carmarthenshire